The Grumman JF "Duck" was an American single-engine amphibious biplane built by Grumman for the United States Navy during the 1930s. The J2F Duck was an improved version of the JF, with its main difference being a longer float.

Design and development
The Grumman JF Duck was manufactured from 1934 until 1936, when production switched to the J2F Duck and later variants. The more obvious external appearance clue to distinguish a JF from an early J2F is the deletion of the inter-aileron strut between the wings on the J2F; less noticeable perhaps is the J2F's slightly longer rear fuselage/float joining fillet beneath the tail.

The Duck's main pontoon was part of the fuselage, almost making it a flying boat, although it appears more like a standard aircraft with an added float. The XJF-1 prototype first flew on 24 April 1933 piloted by Grumman test pilot Paul Hovgard.

Operational history

The JF-1 that was first ordered had the same Pratt & Whitney R-1830-62 engine as the XJF-1 prototype. The US Navy ordered 27 JF-1s with the first Ducks delivered beginning in May 1934 to Norfolk NAS. These early production series had provisions for mounting a machine gun at the rear seat facing aft, as well as a single bomb rack mounted under each wing, capable of carrying a 100 lb (45.4 kg) bomb or depth charge on each. The main float was also a Grumman design (Grumman Model "A") and like the prototype, it included retractable main landing gear, making the Duck a true amphibian. Ducks served as general/utility amphibians for photographic, target-towing, scouting, and rescue work.

Variants
XJF-1 Prototype with 700 hp Pratt & Whitney R-1535-62 engine, one built (BuNo 9218).

JF-1 Production variant with 700 hp Pratt & Whitney R-1830-62 Twin Wasp engine, 27 built (BuNos 9434-9455, 9523-9527).
JF-2 Variant for the United States Coast Guard powered by a 750 hp Wright R-1820-102 Cyclone engine, 15 built (BuNo 0266, 00371-00372, 01647, USCG V141-V155).
JF-3 JF-2 for the U.S. Navy, five built (BuNos 9835-9839).
Grumman G-20Armed version of the Grumman JF-2 for export to Argentina. Eight built.

Operators

 Argentine Navy – Operated eight G-20s.

 United States Navy
 United States Coast Guard
 United States Marine Corps – Operated one JF-2

Specifications (JF-2)

See also

References

Notes

Bibliography
 Allen, Francis J. "A Duck Without Feathers". Air Enthusiast, Issue 23, December 1983 – March 1984, pp. 46–55, 77–78. Bromley, Kent UK: Pilot Press, 1983. 
 "Specifications of American Airplanes". Aviation, Volume 36, No. 4, April 1937, pp. 66–71. (Registration required)

 Thruelsen, Richard. The Grumman Story. New York: Praeger Publishers, Inc., 1976. .
 Treadwell, Terry. Ironworks: Grumman's Fighting Aeroplanes. Shrewsbury, UK: Airlife Publishers, 1990. .

Further reading

External links

 The Grumman J2F Duck

J01F Duck
Grumman J01F
Single-engined tractor aircraft
Biplanes
Floatplanes
Amphibious aircraft
Aircraft first flown in 1933